Ethalia polita is a species of sea snail, a marine gastropod mollusk in the family Trochidae, the top snails.

Description
The white, solid, semi-opaque shell has an orbiculate-conoidal shape. The whorls are almost conical and the base is convex containing a large callus. The whorls are obsoletely transversely striated. The round aperture has a continuous peristome.

Distribution
This marine species occurs off Japan.

References

External links
 To World Register of Marine Species

polita
Gastropods described in 1862